Martin Mason Hazeltine (1827–1903) (also known as M. M. Hazeltine) was an American photographer. Hazeltine specialized in stereography, creating one of the largest collections of scenic landscape photography of the American West dating to the 1860s and 1870s.

Life and career

Early life

Martin Mason Hazeltine was born on July 31, 1827, in Vermont. His mother was Fanny Bancroft and his father, Asa Hazeltine.

Relocation to the West and early career

Hazeltine moved to California in 1850 to be a gold miner. In 1852, he returned to Vermont, where he would learn photography, specifically how to make daguerreotypes, alongside his brother, George Irving Hazeltine. The two brothers left Vermont in 1853, taking a ship from New York, arriving in San Francisco two months later, where they would open a photography studio. In 1855, the brothers closed their studio to pursue their own individual goals. Hazeltine married Barbara Fabing in 1855.

Success in landscape photography

Hazeltine pursued a career in landscape photography, traveling throughout the American West to capture Nevada, Oregon, Idaho, and California, including Yellowstone National Park. He also visited Alaska. Starting in the 1860s he shifted his focus towards California, which would remain his primary subject for almost twenty years. He had a summer home in Yosemite National Park and a winter home in Mendocino County. He entered into business with John James Reilly in June 1876, becoming the primary photography studio for Yosemite Valley. One year, two of Hazeltine's children would die of small pox.

Hazeltine opened a photography gallery in Reno, Nevada, in 1878 and in Boise, Idaho, in 1883. In 1880, he visited Baker City, Oregon, and four years later he opened a sister gallery to the one in Boise.

Later life

Hazeltine settled in Baker City, remaining there for the rest of his life. He died on February 16, 1903, at his Baker City home.

Legacy

A selection of Hazeltine's stereographs reside in the collection of Claremont College, primarily focused around Yosemite Valley and northern California. Additionally, Hazeltine's works are found in the collections of the Oregon Historical Society, the Bancroft Library, and Princeton University.

Further reading

Palmquist, Peter E. and Thomas R. Kailbourn. Pioneer Photographers of the Far West: A Biographical Dictionary, 1840–1865. Stanford: Stanford University Press (2000). p 283-286.

References

1827 births
1903 deaths
Photographers from Vermont
People from Baker City, Oregon
19th-century American photographers
Landscape photographers